Polverara is a comune (municipality) in the Province of Padua in the Italian region Veneto, located about  southwest of Venice and about  southeast of Padua.

The municipality of Polverara contains the frazione (subdivision) Isola dell'Abbà.

Polverara borders the following municipalities: Bovolenta, Brugine, Casalserugo, Legnaro, Ponte San Nicolò.

Demographic evolution

Twin towns
Polverara is twinned with:

  Jimena, Spain

References

Cities and towns in Veneto